Laurette Marcia Gemser (born 5 October 1950) is an Indonesian-Dutch retired actress, model and costume designer. She is primarily known for her work in Italian erotic cinema, most notably the Emanuelle series. Many of her films were collaborations with directors Joe D'Amato and Bruno Mattei.

Gemser has also been credited as Moira Chen, most notably in Love Is Forever (1983).

Early life
Gemser left Indonesia in 1955, at the age of four, and moved with her parents to the Netherlands. She grew up in the Dutch city of Utrecht, where she attended the MULO Regentesseschool high school. After that, she attended the Artibus Art School in Utrecht, where she specialised in fashion design.

Career
After modelling in various magazines in the Netherlands and Belgium, in 1974 she moved to Italy to star in the erotic film Amore libero - Free Love. The film was a box office success and launched Gemser's career. She played one of the masseuses in the 1975 film Emmanuelle 2 (aka Emmanuelle, The Joys of a Woman), and later that year took the starring role in Bitto Albertini's Black Emanuelle. She starred in 5 Black Emanuelle films in less than three years. 

She starred as Laotian actress Keo Sirisomphone in Michael Landon's 1983 American television film, Love Is Forever, in which she was credited as Moira Chen. During the 1970s and 1980s, she made many movies with Joe D'Amato. Gemser continued to make films, at times working with her actor husband, Gabriele Tinti (m. 1976-1991). In the 1990s, she retired from films to work on costume designing for film, and completely vanished from the public life. In 1990, she had made the costumes for what is considered one of the worst movies ever made, Troll 2.

Filmography

References

Footnotes

Sources

External links
 
 
 
 Laura Gemser Biography
 Honey-Dipped Caramel: Laura Gemser (The Grindhouse Effect)

1950 births
Costume designers
Dutch film actresses
Indonesian film actresses
20th-century Indonesian actresses
Dutch people of Indonesian descent
Indo people
Living people
People from Surabaya
Dutch emigrants to Italy